Doylestown is a village located atop the highest point in Wayne County, Ohio, United States,  southwest of Akron. The population was 3,051 at the 2010 census.

History
Doylestown was laid out in 1827 by William Doyle, and named for him.

Geography
Doylestown is at  (40.970278, -81.694346).

Demographics

2010 census
As of the census of 2010, there were 3,051 people, 1,206 households, and 827 families residing in the village. The racial makeup of the village was 97.9% White, 0.6% African American, 0.1% Native American, 0.2% Asian, 0.4% from other races, and 0.9% from two or more races. Hispanic or Latino of any race were 1.4% of the population.

There were 1,206 households, of which 31.9% had children under the age of 18 living with them, 53.1% were married couples living together, 11.4% had a female householder with no husband present, 4.1% had a male householder with no wife present, and 31.4% were non-families. 27.9% of all households were made up of individuals, and 12.6% had someone living alone who was 65 years of age or older. The average household size was 2.45 and the average family size was 2.98.

The median age in the village was 41.6 years. 24.8% of residents were under the age of 18; 6.9% were between the ages of 18 and 24; 21.9% were from 25 to 44; 27.7% were from 45 to 64; and 18.8% were 65 years of age or older. The gender makeup of the village was 46.3% male and 53.7% female.

2000 census
As of the census of 2000, there were 2,799 people, 1,119 households, and 782 families residing in the village. The racial makeup of the village was 98.89% White, 0.14% African American, 0.04% Native American, 0.11% Asian, 0.21% from other races, and 0.61% from two or more races. Hispanic or Latino of any race were 0.61% of the population.

There were 1,119 households, out of which 32.8% had children under the age of 18 living with them, 57.3% were married couples living together, 9.6% had a female householder with no husband present, and 30.1% were non-families. 26.5% of all households were made up of individuals, and 11.0% had someone living alone who was 65 years of age or older. The average household size was 2.44 and the average family size was 2.95.

In the village, the population was spread out, with 24.8% under the age of 18, 6.9% from 18 to 24, 27.7% from 25 to 44, 24.5% from 45 to 64, and 16.0% who were 65 years of age or older. The median age was 40 years. For every 100 females there were 89.1 males. For every 100 females age 18 and over, there were 85.4 males.

The median income for a household in the village was $47,969, and the median income for a family was $57,400. Males had a median income of $39,766 versus $25,701 for females. The per capita income for the village was $21,408. About 3.5% of families and 5.2% of the population were below the poverty line, including 6.7% of those under age 18 and 4.1% of those age 65 or over.

Public services and safety

The Village of Doylestown maintains and operates a modern water treatment and sewage disposal facility providing approximately 1400 households with pure processed water coming from two wells; one west and one south of the village. Given the village's unique geographical ebbs and flows, much of the sewage system employs "forced mains", pumping effluent to higher areas of the village where gravity then "transports" the "product" to the sewage treatment plant. Doylestown maintains a full-time water department at the village hall where residents can pay bills and conduct business 5 days a week.

The Doylestown Police Department and the Chippewa Township Fire Department provide public safety and emergency medical and fire response. The Police Department operates full-time, 24 hours a day, 7 days a week. Officers receive state of the art training and provide community outreach, offering free courses in citizen awareness, CPR and women's self-defense. Home-check programs are available while residents are on vacation and a record of the patrol officer's stops are provided on the homeowner's return. Additionally, the Doylestown Police Department has a K-9 unit.

The Chippewa Township Fire Department is a part-time/paid on-call department. The Fire Department operates out of two stations; Station 1 is located on Gates Street inside the village-proper and Station 2 is located on Hatfield Road in the township. The Fire Department has over 40 Firefighter/EMS personnel. The department conducts many community programs to ensure the safety and well-being of its residents, schools and businesses.

In 2006, the village installed a digital marquee in the Village Square to replace an aging and limited, manually operated message board. The LED (light emitting diode) marquee, operates 24 hours a day, remotely programmed from a computer in the village hall. As well as text it can provide interactive graphics, providing messages free of charge to any local organization or "public good" displays such as changes in trash pickup, public hearings and Amber Alerts.

Message requests simultaneously appear on the village's Public-access television cable TV station operated by Doylestown Communications, a state of the art, locally owned and operated private business offering phone, internet, cable TV and fiber optics. Doylestown Communications has a full-time customer service and technical assistance center in the downtown business area.

Education
Doylestown is served by a branch of the Wayne County Public Library.

References

Further reading
 Holden, Cal. History of Doylestown Ohio, 175th anniversary ed. N.p.: Carlisle, 2002.
 lib.oh.us/newspapers.asp Tri-County Weekly News (Doylestown, Ohio) July 1891-Dec.1893 Accessed November 19, 2008.
  Accessed 11/19/08.
 Walking tour kicks off Doylestown celebration Writer: Jim McGarrity, August, 2002, The Daily Record (newspaper), Wooster Ohio.
 Rogues' Hollow: History and Legends: Russell Frey, 1st Edition,1958.

External links

 Village of Doylestown
 Chippewa Township Fire
 Doylestown Police
 Doylestown branch library website
 Chippewa Township

Villages in Wayne County, Ohio
Villages in Ohio
Populated places established in 1827
1827 establishments in Ohio